Serenade in Red is the fourth album by Oxbow, released in 1996 through Crippled Dick Hot Wax! and in 1997 through SST.

Track listing

Personnel 
Credits adapted from liner notes.
Oxbow
Dan Adams – bass guitar
Greg Davis – drums, percussion
Eugene S. Robinson – vocals
Niko Wenner – guitars, piano, reed organ, production
Production and additional personnel
Bob Adams – organ  (10)
Steve Albini – recording (A1-C8)
Gibbs Chapman – recording (C9, 10)
John Eichenseer – piano (10)
Lou Ciccotelli – Hand drum (B4)
Marianne Faithfull – additional vocals (A1, 10)
Richard Kern – photography
Hafez Modirzadeh – Suona, (A2) Tenor saxophone (C7)
Karen Schub – vocals (B5, C9)
Tom Yoder – trombone (A1)

References

External links
 

1996 albums
Albums produced by Steve Albini
Oxbow (band) albums
SST Records albums